Ellie Challis (born 23 March 2004) is a British Paralympic swimmer. She represented Great Britain at the 2020 Summer Paralympics.

Career
Challis made her international debut at the 2019 World Para Swimming Championships and won a bronze medal in the women's 50 metre backstroke S3.

Challis competed in the women's 50 metre backstroke S3 event at the 2020 Summer Paralympics and won a silver medal.

Personal life
Ellie Challis grew up in Clacton, Essex and attended Tendring Technology College. When she was 16 months old, Challis contracted meningitis, which resulted in the above knee amputation of her legs and a below elbow amputation of her arms.

References

External links 
 

2004 births
Living people
British female backstroke swimmers
Paralympic swimmers of Great Britain
Medalists at the World Para Swimming Championships
Swimmers at the 2020 Summer Paralympics
Medalists at the 2020 Summer Paralympics
Paralympic medalists in swimming
Paralympic silver medalists for Great Britain
S3-classified Paralympic swimmers
21st-century British women